Salvador Franco (died 3 January 2021) was a Venezuelan Pemon political prisoner. Franco was detained in December 2019 accused of having participated on the 22 December in a barracks assault in Bolívar state, dying afterwards due to lack of medical attention.

Detention and death 
Franco was detained in December 2019 accused of having participated on the 22 December in a barracks assault in Bolívar state. He died on 3 January 2021 due to a lack of medical attention. The indigenous people national coordinator of the NGO Foro Penal declared that Franco had COVID-19 and that for months suffered from gastrointestinal diseases related to the insalubrity of his penitentiary center, informing that he lost a large amount of weight in his last months of life. There was a court order for his transfer to a health center since 21 November 2020, but ultimately it was ignored. The Organization of American States Secretary General, Luis Almagro, condemned Franco's death, naming it as "another crime of the dictatorship" and gave his condolences to his relatives and friends.

An autopsy concluded that Franco died of tuberculosis and malnourishment.

See also 
 Carlos Andrés García
 Rafael Acosta Arévalo
 Fernando Albán Salazar
 Pemon conflict

References 

2021 deaths
Prisoners who died in Venezuelan detention
Deaths by starvation
Tuberculosis deaths in Venezuela
Indigenous people of South America
21st-century deaths from tuberculosis